Hedi is a 2016 Tunisian drama film directed by Mohamed Ben Attia. It was selected to compete for the Golden Bear at the 66th Berlin International Film Festival. At Berlin it won the Best First Feature Award and Majd Mastoura won the Silver Bear for Best Actor.

Plot
Hedi (Majd Mastoura) is a young Tunisian man going through an existential crisis. He always done what was told never questioned the conventions of his society and always sought to please his mother Baya who always arranged everything for him. Despite having a decent job as a salesman in a country with an increasingly volatile economic, Hedi is indifferent to his job. His mother is arranging his wedding to Khedija, a relationship that he is apathetic to.

However, a week prior to the actual wedding Hedi meets Rim with whom he starts a passionate affair. Unlike Khedija who comes from a conservative family, Rim is a well travelled independent women with an outgoing character. Rim works as an itinerant dancer and event coordinator for tourists at hotels. Hedi is left with a hard decision to make, settle down for a mediocre marriage or follow his globetrotting sweetheart.

Cast
 Majd Mastoura as Hedi
 Rym Ben Messaoud as Rym
 Sabah Bouzouita as Baya
 Omnia Ben Ghali as Khedija
 Hakim Boumsaoudi as Ahmed

Reception
On review aggregator website Rotten Tomatoes, the film holds an approval rating of 100% based on 11 reviews, and an average rating of 7.2/10. As of 2019, the film had grossed $406,960 internationally.

References

External links
 

2016 films
2016 drama films
Tunisian drama films
2010s Arabic-language films
Best French-Language Film Lumières Award winners